Falsomordellistena pubescens is a species of tumbling flower beetle in the family Mordellidae. It is found in Central and North America, from Panama to Canada.

References

Further reading

 

Mordellidae
Beetles of Central America
Beetles of North America
Taxa named by Johan Christian Fabricius
Beetles described in 1798
Articles created by Qbugbot